The 2011 FILA European Wrestling Championships were held in Dortmund, Germany, from 29 March to 3 April 2011.

Medal table

Team ranking

Medal summary

Men's freestyle

Men's Greco-Roman

Women's freestyle

External links
Official website

Europe
European Wrestling Championships
European Wrestling Championships
2011 European Wrestling Championships
2011 in European sport
Sports competitions in Dortmund
European Wrestling Championships
European Wrestling Championships
2010s in North Rhine-Westphalia